is a railway station in Memuro, Kasai District, Hokkaidō, Japan.

Lines
Hokkaido Railway Company
Nemuro Main Line Station K28

Adjacent stations

Railway stations in Hokkaido Prefecture
Railway stations in Japan opened in 1986